Jang Kun-jae (born November 26, 1977) is a South Korean film director, screenwriter and cinematographer. Jang debuted with Eighteen (2010) which won the grand prize win as part of the 2009 Vancouver International Film Festival's Dragons and Tigers Award. His second feature Sleepless Night (2013) picked up JJ-Star Award (Grand Prize) and JIFF Audience Award (Korean Film Competition) at the 2012 Jeonju International Film Festival. His third feature A Midsummer's Fantasia (2015) received several nominations, including Best Director (Narrative Films) and Best Screenplay at the 3rd Wildflower Film Awards.

Personal life 
Jang studied cinematography at the Korean Academy of Film Arts and received an M.F.A. in Film & Image Production from Chung-Ang University. In 2009, he and producer-cum-wife Kim Woo-ri founded the independent film production company Mocushura and has produced films including Eighteen (2010), Sleepless Night (2013), A Midsummer's Fantasia (2015)., Mom's Song (2020), Vestige (2020) and Juhee From 5 to 7 (2022).

Filmography 
Die Bad (2000) - actor
Smoke-flavored Life (short film, 2004) - still photographer
Waiting for Young-jae (short film, 2005) - cinematographer
Grumpy (2006) - actor
Voice of a Murderer (2007) - actor
Who's That Knocking at My Door? (2007) - cinematography department
Time in Heaven (short film, 2007) - director 
Eighteen (2010) - director, executive producer, screenwriter, editor 
Myselves: The Actress No Makeup Project (2012) - cinematographer
Sleepless Night (2013) - director, executive producer, screenwriter, editor, camera operator
A Midsummer's Fantasia (2015) - director, producer, screenwriter, editor
Mom's Song (2020) - executive Producer
Vestige (2020) - co-director
Monstrous (2022) - director
Juhee From 5 to 7 (2022) - director, executive producer, screenwriter, editor, cinematographer

Awards 
2016 3th Wildflower Film Awards : Best Cinematography (A Midsummer's Fantasia)
2015 Best Korean Independent Film (The Association Korean Independent Film & Video) (A Midsummer's Fantasia)
2015 16th Busan Film Critics Awards: Best Screenplay (A Midsummer's Fantasia)
2015 16th Asiatica Film Mediale : MIGLIOR Film Award (A Midsummer's Fantasia)
2015 35th The Korean Association of Film Critics : FIPRESCI Award (A Midsummer's Fantasia)
2015 3th Muju Film Festival : Jeonbuk Critic Forum Award (A Midsummer's Fantasia)
2015 3th Muju Film Festival : New Vision Award (A Midsummer's Fantasia)
2014 40th Seoul Independent Film Festival : Special Mention (A Midsummer's Fantasia)
2014 19th Busan International Film Festival : DGK(Directors Guild of Korea) Award (A Midsummer's Fantasia)
2012 34th Festival des 3 Continents : Special Mention of Jury (Sleepless Night)
2012 66th Edinburgh International Film Festival : The Student Critics Award (Sleepless Night)
2012 13th Jeonju International Film Festival : Audience Award (Sleepless Night)
2012 13th Jeonju International Film Festival : Grand prize for Korean Film (Sleepless Night)
2010 1th Anaheim International Film Festival : Best Feature Film (Eighteen)
2010 45th Pesaro International Film Festival : Nouvo Cinema Award (Eighteen)
2009 35th Seoul Independent Film Festival : Independent Star Award (Eighteen)
2009 28th Vancouver International Film Festival : Dragons & Tigers Award (Eighteen)

References

External links 
 
 
 

1977 births
Living people
South Korean film directors
South Korean screenwriters